Sterling "Star" Wood was an American football coach and college athletics administrator. He served as the head football coach at Tennessee Polytechnic Institute—now known as Tennessee Technological University—in Cookeville, Tennessee from 1950 to 1951, and East Tennessee State University in Johnson City, Tennessee from 1952 to 1953 and 1955 to 1965. Wood was also the athletic director at East Tennessee State from 1954 to 1962.

Wood attended Big Stone Gap High School in Big Stone Gap, Virginia, where he lettered in football, baseball, and track before graduating as valedictorian of his class in 1931. He moved on to Milligan College in Milligan College, Tennessee, earning varsity letters in football, basketball, and baseball. He received a Master of Arts degree from the University of Tennessee in 1940.

Wood began his career as a teacher at the Roaring Fork mining camp and then as an English teacher and assistant football coach at Coeburn High School in Coeburn, Virginia. He then returned to Milligan College as an English instructor and line coach to assist head football coach Steve Lacy. Wood was the backfield coach under Beattie Feathers at Appalachian State Teachers College—now known as Appalachian State University in 1942 and also an assistant under Feathers at North Carolina State University. He was an assistant football coach at Tennessee Tech under Hooper Eblen for three seasons before succeeding Eblen as head football coach in December 1949.

Head coaching record

References

Year of birth missing
American football ends
Appalachian State Mountaineers football coaches
East Tennessee State Buccaneers athletic directors
East Tennessee State Buccaneers football coaches
Milligan Buffaloes football coaches
Milligan Buffaloes baseball players
Milligan Buffaloes football players
Milligan Buffaloes men's basketball players
Tennessee Tech Golden Eagles football coaches
University of Tennessee alumni
People from Big Stone Gap, Virginia
Coaches of American football from Virginia
Players of American football from Virginia
Baseball players from Virginia
Basketball players from Virginia